The National Second Division (NSD) – also referred to under the working title The Championship – is a proposed Australian national second-tier men's, soccer league, to be run by Football Australia and the Association of Australian Football Clubs (AAFC). It has been suggested that the league will consist of 12 to 16 teams, the bulk of which would be drawn from the existing National Premier Leagues competition. The league's focus would be to improve player development and to boost the overall standing of the game in Australia by generating new interest and revenue.

History
Although informally talked about for many years, momentum for the idea of a national second division increased in October 2016. In March 2017 "The Association of Australian Football Clubs (AAFC) Limited" was established, with the goal of opening dialogue with Football Federation Australia (FFA) and various other stakeholders about establishing a national second division. The board consists of several members representing their respective states and is chaired by Nick Galatas. In January 2018 the AAFC released a timeline for implementation of the league, requesting expressions of interest from clubs for participation in The Championship.

In February 2019, the AAFC announced they were of the belief that the competition could be up and running by the 2020–21 season. On 3 June 2019 the new national second division was given the green light by FFA, paving the way for the next stage of planning and a revised start date of the 2021–22 season.

On 15 September 2020, a provisional list of 30 "partner clubs" was released to the public. The official partners included National Premier League clubs from every state in Australia.

In a January 2021 report, the AAFC claimed that the establishment of a national second division competition would be affordable and feasible.

In July 2021 report, Football Australia spokesperson confirmed to ESPN Australia that the competition remained a priority to the federation, while its chairman Chris Nikou declared in May that he was "expecting (an NSD model) to come to the Football Australia board in the second half of this year, and [would] love to see a second division up for the 2022-23 season".

In late 2021, advocates for a national second-tier in Australia have been campaigning for the better part of two decades to introduce what is, at this point, a global footballing standard. The year 2022 may be an optimistic target, however with Football Australia CEO James Johnson pointing to the pandemic as a buffer to the NSD's unavoidable progression. The NSD would feature 12 foundation clubs with plans to expand up to 16 within the first four years. Officials also aimed to avoid the American-based franchise system and expressed it would become more aligned to the European format, which included promotion and relegation.

A national second division could be played by as early as 2023 with Football Australia set to invest in the establishment of a professional football competition to sit below the A-League. Football Australia says it has undertaken significant planning for a national second-tier competition and has identified a number of models of how it could operate. Senior sources suggest a start date of 2023 is already being targeted. The organisation has identified the second tier as a priority to improve player development with more pathways and a larger pool of professional players, bridge the gap between the semi-professional state leagues and the A-League while also expanding the footprint of the professional game across the country.

In February 2022, a report titled A Genuine National Second Division of Football in Australia was released. AAFC believes it is time for a merit-based competition structure to be introduced as meritocracy is both the "Australian way" and occurs in most competitions around the world. The report has been funded by the Partner Clubs with financial analysis undertaken by MI Associates.

In March 2022, Association of Australian Football Clubs (AAFC) Chairman Nick Galatas has said that all the pieces are there for a National Second Division competition for Australian football and the time to implement is now.

Australian Professional Leagues' (APL) chief executive Danny Townsend eyes national second division progress, "For so long the white whale of the domestic scene, Football Australia and its CEO James Johnson have repeatedly gone on the record to commit to the introduction of an NSD, with the competition tipped as either being introduced in late 2023 as a summer competition or in 2024 under a winter staging".

Football Australia has earmarked March 2024 as its preferred start date for its proposed national second-tier competition, contingent upon the results of an EOI process its CEO James Johnson hopes to commence following its approval at a December meeting of the federation's board.

Football Australia has formally commenced its process to create a National Second Tier Men's competition currently earmarked to commence in March 2024. Football Australia has today invited all interested parties wishing to participate in the yet to be named, National Second Tier, to respond to an Invitation for Expression of Interest (EOI).The EOI process will provide Football Australia with relevant information to assess the level of interest, and to refine the strategy, vision, competition format, operation, and administration of the National Second Tier.

Clubs

As a part of the A Genuine National Second Division of Football in Australia report, 30 clubs signed off on the report believing that they cannot operate at their full capacity within the National Premier Leagues. Teams in bold competed in the National Soccer League between 1977 and 2004. Of the 30 clubs involved, 11 of them competed in the National Soccer League, with 7  of the teams (Adelaide City, APIA Leichhardt, Marconi Stallions, Melbourne Knights, South Melbourne, Sydney Olympic, Wollongong Wolves) having won the national league.

EOIs 
Teams were asked to submit Expressions of Interest (EOIs) to the AAFC indicating that they wanted to be part of the NSD. There are also two merger bids proposed: a Brisbane United franchise (the merging of Brisbane Strikers, Wynnum Wolves and Virginia United), and a South Australian franchise (the merging of Campbelltown City, North Eastern MetroStars, West Adelaide and West Torrens Birkalla). Notable teams that have publicly opted not to send an EOI include Bulleen Lions and Perth SC.

Competition format
There are two formats under consideration. The Football Australia preferred format is what they call the 'Champions League' format with teams playing in an initial group stage before progressing to knock out rounds. The NPL via the AAFC prefer a league format with a minimum of 12 teams, playing a traditional home and away format.

Criticism
The prevarication to start the tournament has been met with criticism due to lack of detail about how it will function; the slow pace to begin the first season is another point of contention.

See also

Australian soccer league system
A-League Men
A-League Women
A-League Youth
E-League

References

External links 
  of the Association of Australian Football Clubs
 Association of Australian Football Clubs on Facebook

2017 establishments in Australia
Sports leagues established in 2017
Football Australia
Summer association football leagues
Soccer leagues in Australia
Second level football leagues in Asia
Expansion of the A-League Men
Proposals in Australia
Proposed association football leagues